Noé Fernando Garza Flores (born 31 May 1948) is a Mexican politician from the Institutional Revolutionary Party. He has served as Deputy of the LIV and LXI Legislatures of the Mexican Congress representing Coahuila, as well as the LIII Legislature of the Congress of Coahuila.

References

1948 births
Living people
Politicians from Coahuila
Members of the Congress of Coahuila
Institutional Revolutionary Party politicians
20th-century Mexican politicians
21st-century Mexican politicians
Autonomous University of Nuevo León alumni
Deputies of the LXI Legislature of Mexico
Members of the Chamber of Deputies (Mexico) for Coahuila